Ian Williams (born 4 August 1931) is a former speedway rider from Wales.

Speedway career 
Williams was a leading speedway rider in the 1950s. He reached the final of the Speedway World Championship in the 1957 Individual Speedway World Championship.

He rode in the top tier of British Speedway from 1957 to 1963, riding for Swindon Robins.

Individual World Championship
 1957 -  London, Wembley Stadium - 14th - 3pts

Family
His two brothers, Freddie Williams and Eric Williams were also speedway riders, Freddie was a double World champion and acted as Ian's mechanic during the 1957 final.

References 

1931 births
British speedway riders
Welsh speedway riders
Swindon Robins riders
Welsh motorcycle racers
Sportspeople from Port Talbot
Living people